Paul Bryant may refer to:

 Bear Bryant (1913–1983), American football coach
 Paul Bryan (musician) (born 1967) American musician, songwriter and producer
 Cubby Bryant (born 1971), American radio personality
 Paul W. Bryant Jr. (born c. 1945), American banker, investor and philanthropist

See also 
 Paul Bryan (disambiguation)
 Paul Bryant Bridge, Tuscaloosa, Alabama